The men's 100 metre backstroke event at the 2008 Olympic Games took place on 10–12 August at the Beijing National Aquatics Center in Beijing, China.

Aaron Peirsol established a new world record of 52.54 to defend his Olympic title in the event. His teammate Matt Grevers earned a silver in 53.11, giving the United States a one-two finish. Meanwhile, Australia's Hayden Stoeckel and Russia's Arkady Vyatchanin, who both finished behind Grevers by 0.07 of a second, tied for the bronze medal in a matching time of 53.18.

Stoeckel's teammate Ashley Delaney finished fifth in 53.31, while Great Britain's Liam Tancock, who led a field in the first 50 metres, faded only to sixth place in 53.39. Spain's Aschwin Wildeboer (53.51) and Japan's Junichi Miyashita (53.99) rounded out the finale. For the first time in Olympic history, all eight swimmers went faster than a winning time of 54.09, previously set by Peirsol in Athens four years earlier.

Earlier, Grevers erased Peirsol's 2004 Olympic record of 53.45 to pick up a top seed in the prelims, until Stoeckel broke a 53-second barrier, and eventually lowered the record to 52.97 in the semifinals.

Records
Prior to this competition, the existing world and Olympic records were as follows.

The following new world and Olympic records were set during this competition.

Results

Heats

Semifinals

Semifinal 1

Semifinal 2

Final

References

External links
Official Olympic Report

Men's backstroke 100 metre
Men's events at the 2008 Summer Olympics